The men's pole vault event at the 1967 European Indoor Games was held on 12 March in Prague.

Results

References

Pole vault at the European Athletics Indoor Championships
Pole